A hyperelliptic curve is a particular kind of algebraic curve. 
There exist hyperelliptic curves of every genus . If the genus of a hyperelliptic curve equals 1, we simply call the curve an elliptic curve. Hence we can see hyperelliptic curves as generalizations of elliptic curves. There is a well-known group structure on the set of points lying on an elliptic curve over some field , which we can describe geometrically with chords and tangents. Generalizing this group structure to the hyperelliptic case is not straightforward. We cannot define the same group law on the set of points lying on a hyperelliptic curve, instead a group structure can be defined on the so-called Jacobian of a hyperelliptic curve. The computations differ depending on the number of points at infinity. This article is about imaginary hyperelliptic curves, these are hyperelliptic curves with exactly 1 point at infinity. Real hyperelliptic curves have two points at infinity.

Formal definition 

Hyperelliptic curves can be defined over fields of any characteristic. Hence we consider an arbitrary field  and its algebraic closure .

Furthermore, we require the curve to have no singular points. This definition differs from the definition of a general hyperelliptic curve in the fact that  can also have degree  in the general case. From now on we drop the adjective imaginary and simply talk about hyperelliptic curves, as is often done in literature. Note that the case  corresponds to  being a cubic polynomial, agreeing with the definition of an elliptic curve. So we could write .

Suppose the point  not equal to  lies on the curve and consider .

Alternative definition 
As  we know that  and hence  is a monic polynomial of degree . This means that over a field  with char every hyperelliptic curve of genus  is isomorphic to one given by an equation of the form  where  is a monic polynomial of degree  and the curve has no singular points. Note that for curves of this form it is easy to check whether the non-singularity criterion is met. We conclude that the curve  has no singular points if and only if  has no multiple roots. Even though the definition of a hyperelliptic curve is quite easy when char, we should not forget about fields of characteristic 2 as hyperelliptic curve cryptography makes extensive use of such fields.

Example 

As  has degree 5 and the roots are all distinct,  is a curve of genus . Its graph is depicted in Figure 1.

From this picture it is immediately clear that we cannot use the chords and tangents method to define a group law on the set of points of a hyperelliptic curve. The group law on elliptic curves is based on the fact that a straight line through two points lying on an elliptic curve has a unique third intersection point with the curve. Note that this is always true since  lies on the curve. From the graph of  it is clear that this does not need to hold for an arbitrary hyperelliptic curve. Actually, Bézout's theorem states that a straight line and a hyperelliptic curve of genus 2 intersect in 5 points. So, a straight line through two point lying on  does not have a unique third intersection point, it has three other intersection points.

Coordinate ring 

is an integral domain. 

Note that any polynomial function  can be written uniquely as 
  with

Norm and degree 

Note that , so  is a polynomial in only one variable.

Properties:

Function field 

For  a point on  that is not finite, i.e.  = , we define  as: 
If  then , i.e. R has a zero at O.
If  then  is not defined, i.e. R has a pole at O.

Order of a polynomial function at a point 
 if  is a finite point which is not Weierstrass.
 if .

The divisor and the Jacobian 

In order to define the Jacobian, we first need the notion of a divisor. Consider a hyperelliptic curve  over some field . This means that a divisor is a finite formal sum of scalar multiples of points. Note that there is no simplification of  given by a single point (as one might expect from the analogy with elliptic curves). The set of all divisors  of the curve  forms an Abelian group where the addition is defined pointwise as follows . It is easy to see that  acts as the identity element and that the inverse of  equals .
Proof. Then  and hence  is a group homomorphism.

Consider a function , then we can look at the formal sum div. It can be shown that  has only a finite number of zeroes and poles, and thus only finitely many of the ord are non-zero. This implies that div is a divisor.
Proof. The identity element  comes from a constant function which is non-zero. Then  comes from the function , and thus  is a principal divisor, too. We conclude that  is closed under addition and inverses, making it into a subgroup.

Therefore, we find  and we can simplify this to  if  is a Weierstrass point.

Example: the Jacobian of an elliptic curve 

For elliptic curves the Jacobian turns out to simply be isomorphic to the usual group on the set of points on this curve, this is basically a corollary of the Abel-Jacobi theorem. To see this consider an elliptic curve  over a field . The first step is to relate a divisor  to every point  on the curve. To a point  on  we associate the divisor , in particular  in linked to the identity element . We now relate the addition law on the Jacobian to the geometric group law on elliptic curves. We then define  as the opposite of this point. Hence in the case  we have that these three points are collinear, thus there is some linear  such that ,  and  satisfy . We conclude that .

The Abel-Jacobi theorem states that a divisor  is principal if and only if  has degree 0 and  under the usual addition law for points on cubic curves. Namely, to  we ascribe the point .

The Jacobian of a hyperelliptic curve 

The general hyperelliptic case is a bit more complicated. Consider a hyperelliptic curve  of genus  over a field . Note that a reduced divisor always has degree 0, also it is possible that  if , but only if  is not a Weierstrass point. Hence every class of the quotient group  has precisely one reduced divisor. Instead of looking at  we can thus look at the set of all reduced divisors.

Reduced divisors and their Mumford representation 
A convenient way to look at reduced divisors is via their Mumford representation. Every non-trivial reduced divisor can be represented by a unique pair of such polynomials. Thus  is a divisor and in fact it can be shown to be a reduced divisor. For example, the condition  ensures that . This gives the 1-1 correspondence between reduced divisors and divisors in Mumford representation. Going back and forth between reduced divisors and their Mumford representation is now an easy task. For example, consider the hyperelliptic curve  of genus 2 over the real numbers. Hence we have . There is exactly one polynomial of degree 1 with these properties, namely . If a point  appears with multiplicity n, the polynomial v needs to satisfy

Cantor's algorithm 
As every element of the Jacobian can be represented by the one reduced divisor it contains, the algorithm allows to perform the group operation on these reduced divisors given in their Mumford representation. The algorithm was originally developed by David G. Cantor (not to be confused with Georg Cantor), explaining the name of the algorithm. Cantor only looked at the case , the general case is due to Koblitz. The algorithm works as follows

 Make  monic by dividing through its leading coefficient.
 Output .

The proof that the algorithm is correct can be found in.

Example
As an example consider the curve

of genus 2 over the real numbers. For the points 
,  and  
and the reduced divisors 
 and  
we know that 
, and 
 

We can compute their sum using Cantor's algorithm. We begin by computing 
, and 
 

In the second step we find 
 and 
 

Now we can compute 
, 
 and 
. 
So 
 and 

Lastly we find 
 and 
. 
After making  monic we conclude that 
 

More on Cantor's algorithm
Cantor's algorithm as presented here has a general form, it holds for hyperelliptic curves of any genus and over any field. However, the algorithm is not very efficient. For example, it requires the use of the extended Euclidean algorithm. If we fix the genus of the curve or the characteristic of the field (or both), we can make the algorithm more efficient. For some special cases we even get explicit addition and doubling formulas which are very fast. For example, there are explicit formulas for hyperelliptic curves of genus 2 

and genus 3.

For hyperelliptic curves it is also fairly easy to visualize the adding of two reduced divisors. Suppose we have a hyperelliptic curve of genus 2 over the real numbers of the form 
 
and two reduced divisors 
 and 
. 
Assume that 
, 
this case has to be treated separately. There is exactly 1 cubic polynomial 
 
going through the four points 
. 
Note here that it could be possible that for example , hence we must take multiplicities into account. Putting  we find that 
 
and hence 
. 
As such we know that the divisor 
 
is principal which implies that the divisor 
 
is equivalent to the divisor 
. 
Furthermore, the divisor 
 
Combining these two properties we conclude that 
 
is equivalent to the reduced divisor 
. 
In a picture this looks like Figure 2.

References

Algebraic curves